Pemberton railway station serves the Pemberton area of Wigan in Greater Manchester, England. It is on the Kirkby branch line from Wigan Wallgate.

The station was opened on 20 November 1848 by the Liverpool and Bury Railway. It on the A571 Billinge Road. The platforms are at the bottom of two ramps (one on each side) which until recently was cobbled on the  bound platform. Once on the platform, the line underneath the bridge is obscured by overgrown trees.

Pemberton is served by major bus routes 1 and 2 operated by Stagecoach Manchester which runs every 10 minutes combined from Wigan town centre.

Facilities
This station is unmanned, however it is accessible via steep ramps from street level. There is no disabled access at this station. Step-free access is provided to both platforms.

Basic shelters are located on each platform, along with digital display screens and timetable poster boards. 

(as of 2020) a self service ticket machine has been installed on the Wigan-bound platform. Passengers must purchase tickets from this machine using a debit or credit card before boarding a train. Passengers wishing to pay by cash must use the ticket machine to gain a Promise to Pay notice for their journey so that they can pay the fare with the on board conductor or at the destination station. This route has penalty fares in operation so failure to produce a valid ticket or Promise to Pay notice can result in you paying twice the amount of the original fare or £20.00 (whichever is greater).

Service 

There is no late evening after 20:09 and there is no Sunday service. A Normal service operates on Bank holidays

References

External links 

Railway stations in the Metropolitan Borough of Wigan
DfT Category F2 stations
Former Lancashire and Yorkshire Railway stations
Northern franchise railway stations
Railway stations in Great Britain opened in 1848